OPKO Health is a medical test and medication company focused on diagnostics and pharmaceuticals. The company is a publicly traded company on NASDAQ and TASE under the symbol "OPK".

History 

OPKO Health is a diversified healthcare company present in more than 30 countries. The company's primary businesses include:
 Bioreference Laboratories, the third largest clinical laboratory with a core genetic testing business and a nearly 300 person sales and marketing team
 The 4K Test Score, a blood test for prostate cancer accurately used to predict the likelihood of cancer spreading to other body parts within the next 20 years and guide in patient care decisions
 Pharmaceutical development such as Rayaldee an FDA approved treatment for secondary hyperparathyroidism (SHIP)
 The company also developed Varubi, a chemotherapy inducted nausea medication out-licensed to Tesaro and TerSera Therapeutics

The Chairman and CEO of OPKO is Dr. Phillip Frost, a billionaire biotech entrepreneur who previously held Chairman positions during the early stages and successful sales of Key Pharmaceuticals, Ivax Corporation, and Teva Pharmaceuticals.

In May 2022, OPKO Health announced the acquisition of U.S based Biotechnology firm, ModeX. The Acquisition worth $300 million saw OPKO gain proprietary immunotherapy technology with a focus on infectious diseases and Oncology, to focus on a range of cancers and infectious diseases, with applicability to other therapeutic areas.

Products lines 
Diagnostics: 
Bioreference Laboratory,
4k Test Score,
Claros 1 Point of Care Diagnostic Platform
Therapeutics: 
Vitamin D and Phosphate Management Products,
Growth Hormone, Hemophilia and Obesity Products,
Other Small Molecule and Biological Therapeutics,
Vaccines
Strategic Investments: 
ARNO Therapuetics,
BioCardia,
ChromaDex Corporation,
Cocrystal Pharma,
MABVAX, Neovasc,
Pharmsynthez,
RXi Pharmaceuticals,
VBI Vaccines,
Sevion,
Xenetic Biosciences,
Zebra Biologic

Litigation 
On September 7, 2018, the SEC filed a lawsuit against a number of individuals and entities including Opko Health and the CEO and Chairman, Dr. Phillip Frost. In December 2018, the company and Dr. Frost entered into settlements with the SEC, which, upon approval by the court in January 2019, resolved the claims. Without admitting or denying any of the allegations, the company agreed to an injunction from violations of Section 13(d) of the “Exchange Act”, a strict liability claim, and to pay a $100,000 penalty, which has been paid.
On March 8, 2019, the SEC filed an amended complaint, with OPKO paying $100,000 "Without admitting or denying the SEC's allegations."

References

External links 
 

Companies based in Miami
Companies listed on the Nasdaq